Paga Airport/Airstrip  is an airstrip serving Paga and Navrongo, towns  in Kassena-Nankana West District of the Upper East Region of Ghana. The airport was initially constructed to help land soldiers to defend the country's borders in case of attacks.

Caution: OurAirports and Great Circle Mapper sources for DGLN have erroneous coordinate and elevation data.

References

Airports in Ghana